Penybont (also sometimes spelled Pen-y-Bont) is a small village in Radnorshire, Powys, Wales. The population of the community at the 2011 census was 428.
The community includes the settlement of Llandegley.

Penybont colliery
The Penybont colliery was opened by the Jaynes Tillery Colliery in 1851. In the 1880s the mine was taken over by Powell's Steam Coal Company Ltd who deepened the mine in 1886.
(Note: This colliery is in Abertillery, nowhere near Penybont in Radnorshire).

Amenities 

The village is served by Pen-y-Bont railway station on the Heart of Wales Line.

It is also famous for its popular garden centre, Midway Plants - Midway Nurseries, and an eighteenth-century coaching inn called the Severn Arms. The village also has a restored shop/museum/gallery called Thomas's Shop where there is a wool and weaving exhibition and workshop. The village hall hosts many activities and Penybont Football Club plays its matches on the race course ground. Horse racing takes place here in the month of August. Until very recently Penybont market was a major centre for sheep and cattle sales.

References

External links 
Photos of Penybont and surrounding area on geograph.org.uk
Midway Plants - Midway Nurseries Website

Villages in Powys